Michael Sarrazin (May 22, 1940 – April 17, 2011) was a Canadian actor. His breakout role was in the 1969 film They Shoot Horses, Don't They?.

Early life and career
Sarrazin was born Jacques Michel André Sarrazin in Quebec City, Quebec, and moved to Montreal as a child. After acting in school plays, he landed his first professional role at age 17.

Sarrazin worked on television productions in Toronto such as Festival and Wojeck.

Universal Studios
Sarrazin gained a contract with Universal Studios. His early appearances include episodes of The Virginian (1965) and Bob Hope Presents the Chrysler Theatre as well as the TV film The Doomsday Flight (1966) and the feature Gunfight in Abilene (1967).

20th Century Fox borrowed him for a starring role in The Flim-Flam Man (1967) with George C. Scott.  Universal then cast him with Anthony Franciosa in A Man Called Gannon (1968) and with James Caan in Journey to Shiloh (1968).

Fox asked him back to star in The Sweet Ride (1968) alongside Jacqueline Bisset, who became his off-screen partner.

Sarrazin appeared in some thrillers for Universal such as Eye of the Cat (1969) and In Search of Gregory (1969).

Stardom
Sarrazin's breakthrough role was in the dark Great Depression drama They Shoot Horses, Don't They? (1969). The Sydney Pollack film earned nine Oscar nominations, and Sarrazin starring alongside Jane Fonda, Susannah York, Gig Young, Red Buttons and Bruce Dern.

He starred in the youth dramas The Pursuit of Happiness (1971) and Believe in Me (1971). He supported Paul Newman in Sometimes a Great Notion (1971), then did The Groundstar Conspiracy (1972) at Universal.

Sarrazin supported James Coburn in Harry in Your Pocket (1973) and received excellent reviews for the television film Frankenstein: The True Story (1973). He appeared as Barbra Streisand's husband in the screwball comedy film For Pete's Sake (1974).  He then starred in the horror film The Reincarnation of Peter Proud (1975), about a man doomed to die the same kind of death twice.

Sarrazin went to Europe to star in the sex comedy The Loves and Times of Scaramouche (1976).

He starred in The Gumball Rally (1976), then had lead roles in the Iran-shot film Caravans (1978), the Canadian mystery thriller Double Negative (1980), and the vigilante crime drama Fighting Back (1982).

Later career
Sarrazin increasingly shifted to television work. He starred in Beulah Land (1980) and The Seduction (1982) and had a support part in Fighting Back (1982).

He also appeared in Joshua Then and Now (1985), the Star Trek: Deep Space Nine episode "The Quickening" (1996) and The Outer Limits episodes "I Hear You Calling" (1996) and "The Other Side" (1999). He hosted the April 15, 1978 episode of Saturday Night Live.

Sarrazin was originally cast to play Joe Buck in the drama film Midnight Cowboy (1969), but he was unable to gain release from a prior contract and the part went to Jon Voight.

Personal life 
For seven years (1967–1974), Sarrazin was in a relationship with actress Jacqueline Bisset, whom he met while making the drama film The Sweet Ride (1968).

Death
Sarrazin died of mesothelioma on April 17, 2011, aged 70, in his hometown of Montreal. According to a family spokesman, his daughters Catherine and Michele were at his side when he died.

Filmography 

 You're No Good (1965, NFB Film) - Eddie (German Version: Freddy)
 The Doomsday Flight (1966) - Army corporal
 Gunfight in Abilene (1967) - Cord Decker
 The Flim-Flam Man (1967) - Curley
 A Man Called Gannon (1968) - Jess Washburn
 Journey to Shiloh (1968) - Miller Nalls
 The Sweet Ride (1968) - Denny McGuire
 Eye of the Cat (1969) - Wylie
 In Search of Gregory (1969) - Gregory Mulvey
 They Shoot Horses, Don't They? (1969) - Robert
 Sometimes a Great Notion (1971) - Leeland Stamper
 The Pursuit of Happiness (1971) - William Popper
 Believe in Me (1971) - Remy
 The Life and Times of Judge Roy Bean (1972)
 The Groundstar Conspiracy (1972) - John David Welles / Peter Bellamy
 Harry in Your Pocket (1973) - Ray Haulihan
 Frankenstein: The True Story (1973, television film) - The Creature
 For Pete's Sake (1974) - Pete Robbins
 The Reincarnation of Peter Proud (1975) - Peter Proud
 The Loves and Times of Scaramouche (1976) - Scaramouche
 The Gumball Rally (1976) - Michael Bannon - Cobra Team
 Caravans (1978) - Mark Miller
 Deadly Companion (1980) - Michael Taylor
 Beulah Land (1980, TV mini-series) - Casey Troy
 The Seduction (1982) - Brandon
 Fighting Back (1982) - Vince Morelli
  (1983) - Szilveszter Matuska
 Joshua Then and Now (1985) - Kevin Hornby
 Murder She Wrote (1985, TV series, "Joshua Peabody Died Here ...Possibly") - David Marsh
 Keeping Track (1986) - Daniel Hawkins
 Mascara (1987) - Bert Sanders
 Captive Hearts (1987) - Sergeant McManus
 Malarek (1988) - Moorcraft
 Passion and Paradise (1989) - Mike Vincent
 The Ray Bradbury Theater (1989, TV series, "The Wind") - John Colt
 Murder She Wrote (1991, TV series, "Murder Plain and Simple") - Jacob Beiler
 The Ray Bradbury Theater (1992, TV series, "Tomorrow's Child" Season 6 Episode 11) - Peter Horne
 La Florida (1993) - Romeo Laflamme
 Bullet to Beijing (1995) - Craig
 Midnight in Saint Petersburg (1995) - Craig
 Star Trek: Deep Space Nine (1996, TV series, "The Quickening") - Trevean
 The Peacekeeper (1997) - Lt. Colonel Douglas Murphy
 Crackerjack 2 (1997) - Smith
 Earthquake in New York (1998) - Dr. Robert Trask
 The Second Arrival (1998) - Prof. Nelson Zarcoff
 A Nero Wolfe Mystery (2002, TV series, "Too Many Clients") - Thomas Yeager
 Feardotcom (2002) - Frank Bryant
 The Christmas Choir (2008; TV movie) - Irish Catholic Priest
 On the Road (2012) - Irish Catholic Priest

Awards and nominations

See also

 List of Canadian actors
 List of Quebec actors

References

External links 
 
 

 

1940 births
2011 deaths
20th-century Canadian male actors
21st-century Canadian male actors
Canadian male film actors
Canadian male television actors
Deaths from cancer in Quebec
Male actors from Montreal
Male actors from Quebec City